Ritsem, among other things has a hydroelectric plant(320MW,160m) which is located where the lake Sitasjaure falls into Akkajaure by a constructed tunnel(16 km made by:"Swedish state powerboard"Vattenfall""). It is located within Gällivare Municipality in Norrbotten County, Sweden. The location also has a camp used by the Sami people, and there is even a mountain cabin and Caravan camp run by the Svenska Turistföreningen. The cabin is mostly used by tourists who are traveling to/from Northern Padjelanta and Northern Sarek and are using the ferry (run by Svenska Turistföreningen) across Akkajaure.

Ritsem is located near the Stora Sjöfallet National Park.

There is a regular bus line between Ritsem and Gällivare during both summer and winter.

Climate
Ritsem has a subarctic climate that is significantly moderated by the North Atlantic Current outside of the nearby Norwegian coastline. As a result, summers are chilly and winters cold, but not severely cold when compared to areas on such northerly latitudes elsewhere in the world. Given its very high latitude, Ritsem sees a long midnight sun period in summer, whereas a shorter polar night period with significant twilight hours occurs in winter. Due to the low sun however, summers can see frost well inside the midnight sun period. Ritsem's all-time June cold record is lower than any other of the 100 stations featured in the national weather service's monthly reports. It does have to be taken into account that these records only date back to 1981. By the time Atlantic depressions set in during late autumn, temperatures are far milder in Ritsem than further east and even further south in Lapland. Days above freezing are common throughout November. The ensuing winters very seldom see temperatures fall below , unlike in the aforementioned areas. Even though the maritime air is strong during winter, precipitation in form of snow is normally not extreme in raw content, although large snowpacks form due to the lack of thaws.

References

External links 
 Svenska Turistföreningen

Populated places in Gällivare Municipality
Lapland (Sweden)